Guillermo Padrés Elías (born 29 June 1969 in Arizpe, Mexico but raised in Cananea, Mexico) is a Mexican politician and a member of the Partido Acción Nacional ("National Action Party", PAN). He served as Governor of Sonora from 2009 to 2015.

Political career
Padres' political career began in 1997 when he was elected to the Congress of Sonora as State Representative for the 7th electoral district with 61% of the vote. In 2000, he was elected Representative for the 2nd Federal District in the LVIII Legislature with 50.35% of the votes, and served until 2003.

In 2006, he was elected to the Senate representing Sonora. His party received 44% of the vote. As Senator, he served as Chairman of the Agriculture and Livestock Committee, and served on the Justice Committee and Water Resources Committee. 

On 16 January 2008, he announced his intention to run for Governor Sonora in the 2009 elections. On 1 March 2009, he won the first day of PAN elections in Sonora, with 2,625 votes against 1,709 for María Dolores del Rio and 477 for Florencio Diaz Armenta. The following day, María Dolores del Rio and Florencio Diaz Armenta withdrew, leaving Padrés as the sole candidate.

Governor of Sonora
In the gubernatorial election of 5 July 2009, Padrés Elías defeated the candidate of the Partido Revolucionario Institucional ("Institutional Revolutionary Party", PRI), Alfonso Elías Serrano, with 464,865 votes for Padrés Elías against 425,050 votes for Elías Serrano; however, the PRI challenged the election results. On 17 August, the State Electoral Tribunal rejected the challenge, and certified the election of Padrés Elías. The PRI appealed to the Federal Electoral Tribunal, which on 11 September also rejected the challenge. Padrés Elías served as Governor of Sonora from 2009 to 2015.

Arrest and criminal charges

He was wanted by the Federal Police and Interpol on multiple charges of corruption, embezzlement, and extortion. In total, Padres transferred US$8.9 million from Mexico to US bank accounts.  After a long man-hunt, Padrés gave himself up to the Federal authorities on 10 November 2016, claiming innocence. He was released on 2 February 2019, to continue the process.

References

Governors of Sonora
1969 births
National Action Party (Mexico) politicians
Members of the Senate of the Republic (Mexico)
Members of the Chamber of Deputies (Mexico)
Politicians from Sonora
Living people
Mexican politicians convicted of crimes
Members of the Congress of Sonora
Fugitives wanted by Mexico
21st-century Mexican politicians
People from Arizpe
People from Cananea